The 1996 Bank of the West Classic was a women's  tennis tournament played on indoor carpet courts at the Oakland-Alameda County Coliseum Arena in Oakland, California in the United States that was part of Tier II of the 1996 WTA Tour. It was the 25th edition of the tournament and was held from November 4 through November 10, 1996. Third-seeded Martina Hingis won the singles title.

Finals

Singles

 Martina Hingis defeated  Monica Seles 6–2, 6–0
 It was Hingis' 2nd singles title of the year and of her career.

Doubles

 Lindsay Davenport /  Mary Joe Fernández defeated  Irina Spîrlea /  Nathalie Tauziat 6–1, 6–3
 It was Davenport's 7th title of the year and the 17th of her career. It was Fernández's 4th title of the year and the 22nd of her career.

References

External links
 ITF tournament edition details
 Tournament draws

Bank of the West Classic
Silicon Valley Classic
Bank of the West Classic
Bank of the West Classic
Bank of the West Classic